Montri Tramote (17 June 1900 – 6 August 1995) was a Thai musician, known as a master of Thai classical music. He was a professional musician under the employment of Fine Arts Department throughout his work life, composing over 200 musical pieces and developing traditional Thai music education into formal theory and curricula. He was named a National Artist in Thai music in 1985.

References

1900 births
1995 deaths
Montri Tramote
Montri Tramote
Montri Tramote
Montri Tramote
Montri Tramote